CUV may refer to:

Chinese Union Version, a translation of the Bible into Chinese
Crossover utility vehicle (Crossover (automobile)), a motor vehicle combining features of a sport utility vehicle and a passenger car